The German submarine U-41 was a Type IXA U-boat of Nazi Germany's Kriegsmarine that operated during World War II. She conducted three war patrols during her short career, two as part of the 6th U-boat Flotilla and one as part of the 2nd flotilla.

On 5 February 1940, U-41 was hit by depth charges from the British A class destroyer  after sinking two enemy merchant vessels and was sunk off the south coast of Ireland. All 49 of her crew members were lost with the boat.

Construction

U-41 was ordered by the Kriegsmarine on 21 November 1936 (as part of Plan Z and in violation of the Treaty of Versailles). She was laid down on 27 November 1937 by AG Weser, Bremen as yard number 946. She was launched on 28 January 1939 and commissioned on 22 April of that same year under the command of Oberleutnant zur See Gustav-Adolf Mugler.

Design
As one of the eight original German Type IX submarines, later designated IXA, U-41 had a displacement of  when at the surface and  while submerged. She had two shafts and two  propellers.

U-41 was fitted with six  torpedo tubes (four fitted at the bow and two at the stern), 22 torpedoes, one  SK C/32 naval gun, 180 rounds, and a  SK C/30 as well as a  C/30 anti-aircraft gun. The boat had a complement of forty-eight.

Service history

First patrol
U-41 left Wilhelmshaven on 19 August 1939, before World War II began, with then Oblt. Gustav Adolf-Mugler in command. Her first patrol involved traveling as far south as Portugal after entering the North Sea and circumnavigating the British Isles. During this patrol, two ships were captured: the Finnish Vega, of 974 GRT, and the 1,099 GRT Suomen Poika. U-41 then returned to Wilhelmshaven, arriving on 17 September 1939.

Second patrol
U-41 left Wilhelmshaven with Mugler in command once again on 7 November 1939. On 12 November, both the 275 GRT British vessel Cresswell and the 11,019 GRT Norwegian ship Arne Kjøde were sunk by torpedoes. The 1,351 GRT British merchant vessel Darino went to the bottom on the 19th. The last enemy vessel to be sunk by U-41 was the French vessel Les Barges II. She displaced a total of 296 GRT and was sunk by a single torpedo on 21 November. The U-boat then returned to port on 7 December 1939.

Third patrol
U-41 left the port of Helgoland on 27 January 1940 with Mugler still in command. During her final patrol, one enemy ship was sunk and one was damaged; both of these attacks took place on 5 February. The first ship that was hit was the 8,096 GRT Dutch vessel Ceronia. The Ceronia was damaged and the 9,874 GRT British ship Beaverburn was sunk. Nevertheless, U-41 did not return to her home port, she was sunk on the same day.

Fate
Following the attacks on the Dutch Ceronia and the British Beaverburn on 5 February 1940, U-41 was attacked by the British A class destroyer  with depth charges. She was hit and sunk off the south coast of Ireland. All 49 of her crew members were lost with the boat during the attack.

Summary of raiding history

References

Bibliography

External links

German Type IX submarines
U-boats commissioned in 1939
U-boats sunk in 1940
World War II submarines of Germany
U-boats sunk by British warships
U-boats sunk by depth charges
World War II shipwrecks in the Celtic Sea
1939 ships
Ships built in Bremen (state)
Ships lost with all hands
Maritime incidents in February 1940